Now That's What I Call Country Volume 3 is an album from the (US) Now! series released on September 14, 2010.

Track listing

Charts

Weekly charts

Year-end charts

References

Country 03
Country music compilation albums
2010 compilation albums